The Lancia Alfa 12 HP (Tipo 51 originally) was the first car made by Lancia. 

The car had originally project name "type 51" and was later renamed to Greek alphabet Alfa.

Description
The cars first road tests begun in September 1907 and production started in 1908. Vincenzo Lancia unveiled his first car in Turin Motor Show in 1908 (January 18-February 2) . 

The car was equipped with sidevalve straight-4 engine.

This model was sold over one hundred copies, car was also made for racing.

References
Lancia by Michael Frostick, 1976. 

Alfa-12HP
First car made by manufacturer
Cars introduced in 1908
Brass Era vehicles